Vyshniye Derevenki is a rural locality and the administrative center of Vyshnederevensky Selsoviet Rural Settlement, Lgovsky District, Kursk Oblast, Russia. Population:

Geography 
The village is located on the Byk River (a left tributary of the Seym), 37.5 km from the Russia–Ukraine border, 65 km south-west of Kursk, 11 km south-east of the district center – the town Lgov.

 Climate
Vyshniye Derevenki has a warm-summer humid continental climate (Dfb in the Köppen climate classification).

Transport 

The rural locality is situated 72 km from Kursk Vostochny Airport, 134 km from Belgorod International Airport and 273 km from Voronezh Peter the Great Airport.

References

Notes

Sources

Rural localities in Lgovsky District
Lgovsky Uyezd